Leslie Bloom is an American art director. She was nominated for an Academy Award in the category of Best Art Direction for the films The Cotton Club and Radio Days.

Selected filmography
 The Cotton Club (1984)
 Radio Days (1987)

References

External links

Year of birth missing (living people)
Living people
American art directors